Heinz Neumann (6 July 1902 – 26 November 1937) was a German politician from the Communist Party (KPD) and a journalist. He was a member of the Communist International, editor in chief of the party newspaper Die Rote Fahne and a member of the Reichstag. He was one of the many victims to Stalin's Great Purge.

Biography
Born in Berlin into a middle-class family, Neumann studied philology and came into contact with Marxist ideas. In 1920, he was admitted into the Communist Party by Ernst Reuter, then General Secretary. August Thalheimer took him under his wing. Neumann began writing editorials for various KPD newspapers in 1921. He dropped out of university in 1922 and became editor of the Rote Fahne (Red Flag). He was arrested and spent six months in prison, during which he took up Russian, learning it so well, he could speak to Soviet party officials without an interpreter. In 1922, he met Joseph Stalin on a trip, speaking to him in Russian. From that point until 1932, he was a strong supporter of Stalin.

He first belonged to the left wing of the KPD, led by Ruth Fischer. In 1923, he aligned himself with Arthur Ewert and Gerhart Eisler and became the political leader of the party's Mecklenburg district. He participated in the Hamburg Uprising and in 1924, had to flee to Vienna, from where he was expelled to the Soviet Union in 1925. There, he succeeded Ivan Katz as Communist Party representative to the Comintern. From July to December 1927, he represented the Comintern in China. Working with Georgian communist Vissarion Lominadze, he helped Chinese communists to organize the Guangzhou Uprising on 11 December 1927. The rebellion was a complete failure and resulted in great casualties. Chinese communist leader Zhang Guotao blamed Neumann for this, claiming that the German had insisted that Guangzhou should be held at all cost against a National Revolutionary Army counter-offensive although this was not feasible for the localn communists.

Neumann went back to Germany in 1928 and after the Wittorf Affair, became one of the most important politicians of the KPD. He was considered the major theoretician of the party and became editor in chief of the Rote Fahne. As the chief ideologist, he was responsible for the ultra-left policies, the Revolutionäre Gewerkschafts Opposition and the social fascism policy. At the same time, he encouraged fighting the Nazis and coined the slogan "Schlagt die Faschisten, wo ihr sie trefft!" (Beat the Fascists wherever you meet them!), valid until 1932.

Along with fellow member of the Reichstag Hans Kippenberger, Neumann was the leader of the KPD's paramilitary wing, the Party Self Defense Unit. As such, Neumann had a major role in the 1931 assassination of Paul Anlauf and Franz Lenck, both of whom were SPD members and Precinct Captains in the Berlin Police.

Elected to the Reichstag in 1930, in 1931, Neumann began to disagree with both Stalin and KPD leader Ernst Thälmann. Neumann felt that by focussing on toppling the ruling SPD, the KPD was underestimating the danger of a takeover by the Nazi Party. He was defeated in October 1932, relieved of his party functions in November 1932, and lost his seat in the Reichstag.

He was sent to Spain to represent the Comintern, then lived illegally in Switzerland. In September 1933, the public prosecutor of Berlin, based on the confessions of 15 of his co-conspirators, charged Neumann with first degree murder for his involvement in the murders of Captains Anlauf and Lenck.

In January 1934, while still a fugitive from the German police, Neumann was accused of having tried to split the KPD, he was forced to write a "self criticism". In late 1934, he was arrested in Zurich by the Swiss immigration authorities and was imprisoned for six months, after which, he was expelled. He was sent to the Soviet Union, where he fell victim to the Great Purge.

Death
Heinz Neumann was arrested by the NKVD on 27 April 1937. On November 26, 1937, he was sentenced to death by the Military Collegium of the Supreme Court of the Soviet Union. He was shot on the same day.

Personal life
Heinz Neumann began dating Margarete Buber-Neumann in 1929 and later lived in unmarried union with her. After he disappeared in the Great Purge, she was also arrested and served time in the gulag. 

After the Nazi-Soviet Pact, Buber-Neumann was handed over to the Nazi Gestapo along with many other KPD members whom Stalin had sent to the gulag. After her return to Germany, Buber-Neumann was imprisoned by the Nazis in Ravensbrück concentration camp, but survived to write her memoirs of both the gulag and the Nazi death camps. After her release, Buber-Neumann spent the remainder of her life as an outspoken believer in the moral equivalency of Nazism and communism. She died in 1989, just days before the fall of the Berlin Wall.

Works 
 Die vaterländischen Mörder Deutschlands. Bayern in der kleinen Entente. Das Ergebnis des Münchener Hochverratsprozesses. Berlin 1923 (with Karl Frank)
 Maslows Offensive gegen den Leninismus. Kritische Bemerkungen zur Parteidiskussion. Hamburg 1925
 Was ist Bolschewisierung? Hamburg 1925
 Der ultralinke Menschewismus. Berlin 1926
 J. W. Stalin. Hamburg 1930
 Durch rote Einheit zur Macht. Heinz Neumanns Abrechnung mit der Politik des sozialdemokratischen Parteivorstandes. Berlin 1931
 Prestes, der Freiheitsheld von Brasilien. Moskau 1936.

References

Bibliography

External links 
 Heinz Neumann Archive at marxists.org
 
 Heinz Neumann in the Neue Deutsche Biographie 
 

1902 births
1937 deaths
Murders of Paul Anlauf and Franz Lenck
Politicians from Berlin
Communist Party of Germany politicians
Members of the Reichstag of the Weimar Republic
German expatriates in Russia
Great Purge victims from Germany
Executed people from Berlin